Qaleh-ye Azari (also Romanized as Qal‘eh-ye Āz̄arī) is a village in Tankaman Rural District, Tankaman District, Nazarabad County, Alborz Province, Iran. At the 2006 census, its population was 522, in 141 families.

References 

Populated places in Nazarabad County